Thiruvakkudi  is a village in the  
Arimalamrevenue block of Pudukkottai district 
, Tamil Nadu, India.

References

Villages in Pudukkottai district